The inauguration of Warren G. Harding as the 29th president of the United States was held on Friday, March 4, 1921, at the East Portico of the United States Capitol in Washington, D.C. This was the 34th inauguration and marked the commencement of Warren G. Harding's only term as president and of Calvin Coolidge's only term as vice president. Harding died  into this term, and Coolidge succeeded to the presidency.

Chief Justice Edward D. White administered the presidential oath of office. Harding placed his hand on the Washington Inaugural Bible as he recited the oath.

Coolidge was sworn in as vice president in the Senate Chamber and on the east portico of the Capitol, respectively, which he believed ruined "all semblance of unity and continuity." Critic H. L. Mencken described Harding's inaugural address, writing, "It is rumble and bumble. It is flap and doodle. It is balder and dash. But I grow lyrical."

This inauguration was the first in which an automobile was used to transport the president-elect and the outgoing president (Woodrow Wilson) to and from the Capitol. Wilson, still compromised by his 1919 stroke, did not attend the ceremony itself.

See also
Presidency of Warren G. Harding
1920 United States presidential election
Calvin Coolidge

References

External links

Text of Harding's Inaugural Address

United States presidential inaugurations
1921 in Washington, D.C.
1921 in American politics
Presidency of Warren G. Harding
March 1921 events in the United States